The 37th Directors Guild of America Awards, honoring the outstanding directorial achievements in film and television in 1984, were presented on March 9, 1985 at the Beverly Hilton and the Plaza Hotel. The feature film nominees were announced on February 1, 1985, nominees in seven television categories were announced on February 5, 1985, and the commercial nominees were announced on February 12, 1985.

Winners and nominees

Film

Television

Commercials

D.W. Griffith Award
 Billy Wilder

Frank Capra Achievement Award
 Jane Schimel
 Abby Singer

Robert B. Aldrich Service Award
 Elliot Silverstein

Honorary Life Member
 Tom Donovan

References

External links
 

Directors Guild of America Awards
1984 film awards
1984 television awards
Direct
Direct
Directors
Directors Guild of America Awards
Directors Guild of America Awards
Directors Guild of America Awards